Anomphalus jaggerius is an extinct species of Permian sea snail. Fossils have been found in Artinskian era limestone from the Bird Spring Formation in the southern Arrow Canyon Range of the US State of Nevada. It was named after Rolling Stones lead singer Mick Jagger.

See also
Aegrotocatellus jaggeri - a species of trilobite named after Jagger
Jaggermeryx naida  - a species of Miocene ungulate named after Jagger
Perirehaedulus richardsi  - a species of prehistoric trilobite named after British musician Keith Richards
List of organisms named after famous people (born 1900–1949)

References

External links
 

Permian gastropods
Mick Jagger
Fossil taxa described in 1972
Trochoidea (superfamily)